Stan South (born 24 July 1996) is an English professional rugby union player who currently plays for Old Glory DC of Major League Rugby (MLR) in the United States. He previously played lock or flanker for CA Brive.

South began his career at Harlequins and made his professional debut against Gloucester in the Anglo-Welsh Cup in 2015. He joined Exeter Chiefs on a one-year deal in 2019, despite having initially signed for Coventry. He joined Edinburgh on loan in February 2020 as cover during the Six Nations.

On 6 November 2020, South traveled to France to join Top 14 side Brive for the 2020-21 season.

Feeling stuck in his European rugby career, South travelled to the United States joined Old Glory DC in Major League Rugby for the 2021 season.

South was a member of the England under-20 team that won the 2016 World Rugby Under 20 Championship, starting the final in the second row.

References

1996 births
Living people
Harlequin F.C. players
Exeter Chiefs players
Edinburgh Rugby players
Rugby union locks
People educated at Whitgift School
English rugby union players
Richmond F.C. players
CA Brive players
Old Glory DC players
Rugby union players from Southampton